The Newark Public Library (NPL) is a public library system in Newark, New Jersey. The library system offers numerous programs and events to its diverse population. With eight different locations, the Newark Public Library serves as a Statewide Reference Center. The Newark Public Library is the public library system for the city of Newark, Essex County, New Jersey, United States. Currently, the library system boasts an enormous collection of both art and literature, art and history exhibits, a variety of programs for all ages, and much more.

Locations 
The First Avenue Branch, located in upper Roseville, and the Madison Branch, located in Clinton Hill, closed down on August 27, 2010, due to budget cuts. The Roseville Branch, located in lower Roseville, is temporarily closed. The Clinton Branch, located on Bergen Street is permanently closed due to building conditions.

History
The historic Newark Public Library traces its beginnings to the Newark Library Association, a private organization that was chartered in 1847.  In 1887, the people of Newark approved the founding of a Free Public Library. The first director of the library was Frank Pierce Hill.

The Newark 'Free Public Library opened on West Park Street in the central ward of downtown Newark in 1889 and offered a collection of over 10,000 books which had been acquired from the Newark Library Association.

Over time, the influx of more books and an increasing population necessitated the construction of a new building at 5 Washington Street, the current location of the main branch of the Newark Public Library.  An architectural marvel, the new building, designed by Rankin and Kellogg, was influenced by the 15th century Palazzo Strozzi in Florence, Italy. The library also served as a museum, lecture hall, and a gallery.

In 1902, John Cotton Dana succeeded Frank Pierce Hill to become the director of the library. John Cotton Dana greatly promoted the educational value of the library. For example, he established foreign language collections for immigrants and even developed a special collection for the business community. This "Business Branch" was the first of its kind in the nation. John Cotton Dana was employed at the Newark Public Library in Newark, New Jersey, until his death in 1929. John Cotton Dana also founded the Newark Museum in 1909, inside the library, directing it until his death.

After the death of Dana in 1929, the library continued to thrive. Beatrice Winser took over as director of the library and Newark Museum until 1942. In 1930, the library had a book truck which brought books to children throughout Newark. In 1929, the library's New Jersey Collection was founded, which later became The Charles F. Cummings New Jersey Information Center. The CFCNJIC became a separate Library department in 1951.

Throughout the second half of the twentieth century, the library continued to grow under the leadership of John Boyleton Kaiser (1943-1958), James E. “Ned” Bryan (1958-1972), J. Bernard Schein (1972-1977), William Urban (1977-1979), Thomas J. Alrutz (1979-1988), Alex Boyd (1988-2004), Wilma Grey (2005-2015), Jeffrey Trzeciak (2017-2019), Joslyn Bowling Dixon (2020–present) and others. In 1963 the library became a Federal Regional Depository.

In 1989, the library opened what is now the James Brown African American Room to "generate and maintain an appreciation of African American history and culture". Also in 1989, La Sala was established with the "largest collection of Spanish–language library resources in New Jersey.

In 2002, The Newark Public Library partnered with a Latino community group, the Friends the Hispanic Research Information Center (HRIC), to create the New Jersey Hispanic Research and Information Center (NJHRIC).

In 2018, the library launched a digital collection at http://digital.npl.org.

Main Library Departments 

 The Reference Center provides information on all subjects. This division serves as the statewide reference center for libraries researching art, business, music, patents and trademarks, and U.S. government documents questions.
 The Charles F. Cummings New Jersey Information Center provides New Jersey reference. It is home to many unique collections on Newark and NJ including books, photographs, microfilm and archives.
 The New Jersey Hispanic Research and Information Center consists of La Sala Hispanoamericana, the state's largest collection of Spanish Language books, the Hispanic Reference Collection, and the Puerto Rican Community Archives.
 Special Collections includes graphic and visual arts collections as diverse as fine prints, medieval manuscripts and shopping bags.
 The James Brown African American Room was established to "document, preserve and foster the history, culture and literary achievements of African Americans".
 Other spaces in the main branch include the Children's Room, Teen Room, LGBTQ Center, and Special Services Room.
The Philip Roth Room opened in 2020.

Architecture
The four–story Italian Renaissance-inspired Main Library building was designed by John Hall Rankin and Thomas M. Kellogg, drawing inspiration from the 15th century Palazzo Strozzi in Florence, Italy. Their intentions were to have the building not only serve as a library, but also as a museum, lecture hall, and gallery, that would provide cultural, as well as educational experiences in an aesthetically pleasing environment.  The building structure includes an open center court/foyer with arches and mosaics that extended upward to a stained glass ceiling four stories high.

Administration 
On July 9, 2020, the library announced the appointment of a new library director, Joslyn Bowling Dixon. Ms. Dixon began her role as library director on August 3, 2020.

Board of Trustees 
As of January 2021:

 Dr. Lauren Wells, President
 Dr. Anasa Maat, Vice President
 Dr. Rosemary Steinbaum, Secretary
 Dr. Timothy J. Crist, Treasurer
 Ms. Antoinette Richardson (Alternate for Ras J. Baraka, Mayor of Newark)
 Ms. Nicole Johnson (Alternate for Roger León, Superintendent of Newark Public Schools)
 Mr. Miguel Rodriguez
 Mr. Domingo Morel
 Mr. Hassan Abdus-Sabur

Main Library expansion and renovations
The Main Library has been renovated many times since its founding. In 1922 and 1931 additions was completed. In 1927, a mural was painted on the 2nd floor - The Fountain of Knowledge - this mural still exists today. In 1949 a 10,000 square foot maintenance building was added.

In 1952, a $1,500,000 renovation project modernized the building including covering the 2nd floor mural. From 1987 to 1888 another renovation took place—restoring the mural.

In 2006, renovations were carried out in the lobby, including new front doors. In 2010-2011 projects included new carpeting and painting.

In 2016, author Philip Roth donated his book collection to the library. The Philip Roth room opened in 2020.

Special Programs

Truth, Racial Healing, and Transformation (TRHT) Campus Centers 
After being selected by the Association of American College & Universities (AAC&U) to partake in the implementation of a Truth, Racial Healing, and Transformation (TRHT) campus centers, Rutgers University-Newark partnered with the Newark Public Library to aid in the development of the program. The AAC&U selected 10 universities to implement these programs and provided each a grant of $30,000.  The goal is to bring to light the issues regarding racial inequality in diverse cities like Newark. Though selected in August 2017, the programs began on January 17, 2017, at the Newark Public Library and include events that addressed DACA and the Charlottesville Riots and used spoken word poetry and art as mediums.

Philip Roth Lectures 
Since 2016, the Newark Library has hosted an annual Philip Roth Lecture. Speakers have included Zadie Smith, Robert Caro, Salman Rushdie, Sean Wilentz, Tracy K. Smith, and Ayad Akhtar.

References

Further reading
 
Edwin Beckerman (1997). A History of New Jersery Libraries. Scarecrow Press. .
George Robb (2019). "Propaganda, Censorship and Book Drives: The Newark Library in World War One". New Jersey Studies: An Interdisciplinary Journal.

External links
 Newark Public Library
Digital collection

Public libraries in New Jersey
Beaux-Arts architecture in New Jersey
Education in Newark, New Jersey
Tourist attractions in Essex County, New Jersey
Historic district contributing properties in Newark, New Jersey
National Register of Historic Places in Newark, New Jersey
New Jersey Register of Historic Places
Non-profit organizations based in New Jersey
Culture of Newark, New Jersey